Herbert Randolph Sugar (June 7, 1936 – March 25, 2012) was an American boxing writer and sports historian known for his trademark fedora and unlit cigar.

Biography

Early life and education
Sugar was born in Washington, D.C. on June 7, 1936. In 1953, he graduated from Woodrow Wilson High School in Washington, where he was a reporter and columnist for the school's newspaper. His entry in the high school yearbook for that year predicted he "will become a radio announcer or sports writer." Sugar graduated from the University of Maryland before earning a JD and MBA from the University of Michigan in 1960.

Career
After passing the bar, Sugar worked in advertising, including with the McCann Erickson agency. He was Publisher-Editor of Baseball Monthly magazine in 1962. Sugar bought Boxing Illustrated magazine in 1969 and was editor until 1973. From 1979 to 1983 he was editor and publisher of The Ring magazine. In 1988 he again became editor of Boxing Illustrated.  In 1998 he founded Bert Sugar's Fight Game.

Sugar wrote more than 80 books, focusing on his favorite sports of boxing and baseball. Among his boxing books are Great Fights, Bert Sugar on Boxing, 100 Years of Boxing, Sting like a Bee (with José Torres), The Ageless Warrior (Preface, with Mike Fitzgerald) and Boxing's Greatest Fighters. Sugar was ranked as "The Greatest Boxing Writer of the 20th Century" by the International Veterans Boxing Association.

In May 2009 Sugar published Bert Sugar's Baseball Hall of Fame: A Living History of America's Greatest Game through Running Press.

With James Randi, Sugar co-wrote a book about Harry Houdini titled Houdini, His Life and Art.

Along with Lou Albano, he helped write The Complete Idiot's Guide to Pro Wrestling. He wrote a regular sports column for Smoke Magazine, a quarterly cigar lifestyle magazine. Sugar was described by sportscaster Bob Costas as being "Runyonesque" (in reference to Damon Runyon).

Representation in other media
Sugar appeared in several films playing himself, including Night and the City (1992), The Great White Hype, and Rocky Balboa. Interviews with Sugar feature in the documentary Unforgivable Blackness: The Rise and Fall of Jack Johnson.

Death
Sugar died from cardiac arrest on March 25, 2012, at age 75. His family was at his bedside at Northern Westchester Hospital in Mount Kisco, New York. Prior to his death, Sugar had been battling lung cancer.

References

External links
  Talkin' Boxing with Bert Sugar - Boxing Insider - August 12, 2011

1936 births
2012 deaths
American sportswriters
American people of Hungarian-Jewish descent
Jewish American sportspeople
Journalists from Washington, D.C.
University of Maryland, College Park alumni
University of Michigan Law School alumni
International Boxing Hall of Fame inductees
Ross School of Business alumni
American male non-fiction writers
21st-century American Jews
The Ring (magazine) people